The Men's team pursuit competition at the 2019 World Single Distances Speed Skating Championships was held on 8 February 2019.

Results
The race was started at 18:01.

References

Men's team pursuit